This is a list of the main career statistics of retired professional American tennis player, Andy Roddick. Throughout his career, Roddick won thirty-two ATP singles titles including one grand slam singles title and five ATP Masters 1000 singles titles. He was also the runner-up at the Wimbledon Championships in 2004, 2005 and 2009 and the US Open in 2006, losing on all four occasions to Roger Federer. Roddick was also a four-time semi-finalist at the Australian Open and a three-time semi-finalist at the year-ending ATP World Tour Finals. On November 3, 2003, Roddick became the World No. 1 for the first time in his career.

Career achievements

Roddick reached his first career Grand Slam singles quarterfinal at the 2001 US Open, where he lost to fourth-seeded Australian and eventual champion Lleyton Hewitt in a five-set thriller 7–6, 3–6, 4–6, 6–3, 4–6. A year later, he reached his first masters series singles final at the 2002 Rogers Cup, losing in straight sets to Argentine Guillermo Cañas. The following year, Roddick reached his first grand slam semi-final at the 2003 Australian Open, where he lost to thirty-first seed Rainer Schüttler in four sets, 5–7, 6–2, 3–6, 3–6. In August, Roddick won his first major singles title at the 2003 Rogers Cup, defeating David Nalbandian in the final in straight sets. Three weeks later, Roddick rallied from two sets and a match point down to defeat Nalbandian in five sets to reach his first Grand Slam singles final at the US Open, where he defeated fourth-seeded Spaniard Juan Carlos Ferrero in the final in straight sets, 6–3, 7–6, 6–3, to win his first and only Grand Slam singles title to date. Roddick's strong results throughout the year allowed him to qualify for the year-ending ATP World Tour Finals for the first time in his career. He advanced to the semi-finals of the event after victories over Guillermo Coria and Carlos Moyá in the round robin stage but lost in straights to then World No. 2 Roger Federer in the semi-finals. Despite the loss, Roddick finished the year as the World No. 1 for the first (and only) time in his career, becoming the first American player to finish a season as World No. 1 since Andre Agassi and the youngest American player to have held the top ranking since computer rankings began in 1973.

In July 2004, Roddick reached his first Wimbledon final but lost in four sets to then World No. 1, Roger Federer. He reached the final of the event again the following year but once again lost to Federer, this time in straight sets. The following year, Roddick reached his fourth grand slam singles final but once again lost to Federer, this time in the final of the US Open. In 2007, Roddick reached the semi-finals of the year-ending ATP World Tour Finals for the third and final time in his career, losing in straight sets to Spaniard, David Ferrer.

Roddick enjoyed a resurgent year in 2009, during which he reached the semi-finals of the Australian Open for the fourth and final time in his career and the fourth round of the French Open for the first and only time in his career. The highlight of Roddick's year came at the 2009 Wimbledon Championships where he reached his third final at the event and fifth and final grand slam singles final. There, he lost to Federer in a five set thriller. On July 22, 2012, Roddick won his thirty-second and final career singles title at the Atlanta Tennis Championships, defeating Gilles Müller of Luxembourg in the final in three sets; Roddick won his first career singles title at the same event eleven years prior.

Significant finals

Grand Slam finals

Singles: 5 finals (1–4)

Masters Series finals

Singles: 9 finals (5–4)

Doubles: 2 finals (1–1)

ATP career finals

Singles: 52 (32 titles, 20 runner-ups)

Doubles: 8 (4–4)

ATP Challenger Tour career finals

Singles: 4 (3 titles, 1 runner-up)

Doubles: 2 (1 title, 1 runner-up)

Singles performance timeline

 *Qualified for Year-end championships in 2005 and 2009, but pulled out both times due to injury.
1 Held as Hamburg Masters (outdoor clay) until 2008, Madrid Masters (outdoor clay) 2009 – onward.
2 Held as Stuttgart Masters (indoor hard) until 2001, Madrid Masters (indoor hard) from 2002 to 2008, and Shanghai Masters (outdoor hard) 2009 – onward.

Record against top 10 players
Roddick's match record against players who were ranked in the top 10, with those who reached No. 1 in boldface

  Tommy Robredo 11–0
  Jürgen Melzer 10–0
  Fernando Verdasco 10–3
  Mardy Fish 9–3
  Fernando González 9–3
  James Blake 9–3
  Sébastien Grosjean 8–1
  Paradorn Srichaphan 7–1
  Ivan Ljubičić 7–4
  Lleyton Hewitt 7–7
 / Greg Rusedski 6–1
  Radek Štěpánek 6–1
  Tomáš Berdych 6–5
  Tommy Haas 6–7
  Mario Ančić 5–0
  Guillermo Coria 5–0
  Juan Carlos Ferrero 5–0
  Thomas Johansson 5–0
  Nicolas Kiefer 5–0
  Nikolay Davydenko 5–1
  Jonas Björkman 5–2
  Novak Djokovic 5–4
  Todd Martin 4–1
  Carlos Moyá 4–1
  David Nalbandian 4–2
  John Isner 4–2
  Marat Safin 4–3
  David Ferrer 4–7
  Ernests Gulbis 3–0
  Karol Kučera 3–0
  Marcos Baghdatis 3–1
  Arnaud Clément 3–2
  Thomas Enqvist 3–2
  Richard Gasquet 3–2
  Mikhail Youzhny 3–2
  Gaël Monfils 3–5
  Andy Murray 3–8
  Rafael Nadal 3–7
  Roger Federer 3–21
  Fabio Fognini 2–0 
  Nicolás Almagro 2–0
  Michael Chang 2–0
  Àlex Corretja 2–0
  Wayne Ferreira 2–0
  Jiří Novák 2–0
  Marcelo Ríos 2–0
  Joachim Johansson 2–1
  Pete Sampras 2–1
  Jo-Wilfried Tsonga 2–1
  Kevin Anderson 2–2
  Gilles Simon 2–2
  Guillermo Cañas 2–2
 / Janko Tipsarević 2–2
  Tim Henman 2–3
  Robin Söderling 2–4
  Grigor Dimitrov 1–0
  Kei Nishikori 1–0
  Gastón Gaudio 1–0
  Richard Krajicek 1–0
  Nicolás Lapentti 1–0
  Mark Philippoussis 1–0
  Milos Raonic 1–0
  Jack Sock 1–0
  Marc Rosset 1–0
  Juan Mónaco 1–1
  Albert Costa 1–1
  Gustavo Kuerten 1–1 
  Marin Čilić 1–2
  Juan Martín del Potro 1–4
  Nicolás Massú 2–3
  Rainer Schüttler 1–3
  Stanislas Wawrinka 1–3
  Andre Agassi 1–5
 / Goran Ivanišević 0–1

Top 10 wins

National participation

Team competition: 2 (1–1)

Davis Cup  (33–12)

Grand Slam titles details

ATP Tour career earnings

* Statistics correct .

Career Grand Slam seedings 
The tournaments won by Roddick are in boldface, while those where he was runner-up are italicized.

Notable exhibitions

Team competitions

References

External links
 
 
 

Roddick, Andy